The 2019 Kansas Lottery 300 is a NASCAR Xfinity Series race held on October 19, 2019, at Kansas Speedway in Kansas City, Kansas. Contested over 200 laps on the 1.5 mile (2.4 km) asphalt speedway, it was the 30th race of the 2019 NASCAR Xfinity Series season, fourth race of the Playoffs, and the first race of the Round of 8.

Background

Track

Kansas Speedway is a  tri-oval race track in Kansas City, Kansas. It was built in 2001 and it currently hosts two annual NASCAR race weekends. The IndyCar Series also held races at the venue until 2011. The speedway is owned and operated by the International Speedway Corporation.

Entry list

Practice

First practice

Final practice

Qualifying

Qualifying results

. – Playoffs driver

Race

Summary
Christopher Bell started on pole and lead all of Stage 1, also gaining the stage points. Austin Cindric pitted shortly before the end of the stage and did not gain stage points.

On lap 71, Cindric hit Harrison Burton while they were racing each other. Burton then went down on Cindric, but ultimately shot himself into the wall and ended his day. Cindric then had to pit twice during the green flag for tire rub issues. Cole Custer won Stage 2 ahead of Bell and Tyler Reddick.

On lap 151, Justin Haley drove into Custer, who managed to save his car but lost several positions. On lap 164, John Hunter Nemechek spun, bringing out a caution. All the leaders got one set of fresh tires in the pit stops, and everyone except Michael Annett opted to pit.

With 15 to go, Chase Briscoe and Bell were in a tight battle for the lead and they approached Garrett Smithley, who drove slightly up the race track. Briscoe and Bell were unsure where Smithley would go, resulting in them both plowed into him. The restart caused another caution as Joey Gase and Noah Gragson were involved in an accident.

On the restart, Brandon Jones grabbed the lead from Briscoe. Reddick passed Briscoe and made up a lot of ground, but ran out of time. Jones took his first win by holding off Reddick. 

Due to Jones taking the victory, none of the playoff drivers locked themselves into the final round of the playoffs after the race. Briscoe, Annett, Gragson, and Cindric exited the race below the cutoff line.

After the race, Custer and Reddick were involved in a physical altercation; Custer was upset at Reddick sliding them up the track during a restart. Reddick was annoyed when Custer placed his hand on his shoulder, and quickly responded by shoving him. Their crews quickly got involved, and Reddick ultimately received a cut over his eye from being thrown to the ground.

Stage Results

Stage One
Laps: 45

Stage Two
Laps: 45

Final Stage Results

Stage Three
Laps: 110

. – Driver advanced to the next round of the playoffs.

. – Playoffs driver

References

2019 in sports in Kansas
NASCAR races at Kansas Speedway
Kansas Lottery 300
2019 NASCAR Xfinity Series